Adolfo Bonilla Gómez (born 7 January 1972) is a Mexican politician affiliated with the PRI. He currently serves as Field Secretary.

References

1972 births
Living people
Politicians from Fresnillo, Zacatecas
Members of the Chamber of Deputies (Mexico)
Institutional Revolutionary Party politicians
21st-century Mexican politicians
Deputies of the LXII Legislature of Mexico